Psalm 12 is the twelfth psalm of the Book of Psalms, beginning in English in the King James Version: "Help, Lord; for the godly man ceaseth; for the faithful fail from among the children of men." In the Greek Septuagint and the Latin Vulgate, it is psalm 11 in a slightly different numbering, "Salvum me fac". Its authorship is traditionally assigned to King David.

The psalm forms a regular part of Jewish, Catholic, Lutheran, Anglican and other Protestant liturgies. It was set to music by composers including Johann Sebastian Bach.

Text

Hebrew Bible version 
The following is the Hebrew text of Psalm 12:

King James Version 

 Help, Lord; for the godly man ceaseth; for the faithful fail from among the children of men.
 They speak vanity every one with his neighbour: with flattering lips and with a double heart do they speak.
 The Lord shall cut off all flattering lips, and the tongue that speaketh proud things:
 Who have said, With our tongue will we prevail; our lips are our own: who is lord over us?
 For the oppression of the poor, for the sighing of the needy, now will I arise, saith the Lord; I will set him in safety from him that puffeth at him.
 The words of the Lord are pure words: as silver tried in a furnace of earth, purified seven times.
 Thou shalt keep them, O Lord, thou shalt preserve them from this generation for ever.
 The wicked walk on every side, when the vilest men are exalted.

Interpretation

There is a cry for help amidst evil men: God will cut off flattering lips. Charles Spurgeon vividly describes the finality saying

An answer to the cry for help comes: God will arise and defend the poor. Many writers have pointed out that it is not at all clear where God said "Because the poor are plundered, because the needy groan, I will now arise". Other possibilities include , "I will arise", in the context of a greater salvation for Israel, or arising for judgement as in Genesis 18:20-21, where the Lord got up and went down to Sodom because of cries of oppression.

Hope in God's promise that "I will arise and defend the poor" is bolstered by a reminder that God's word is like silver that was purified over and over even 7 times. That help will be apparently deferred in Psalm 13 with cries of 'How long?' David himself, in his final Psalm of blessing for Solomon, urges Solomon to also defend the poor in Psalm 72:4 emulating God.

Man's sinful state is a theme and like the two psalms before it, Psalm 12 ends with an uncomplimentary statement about fallen men in verse 8. The godly man ceases in psalm 12:1, sinful remain in Psalm 14:1-4 

The reformation theologian John Calvin, in his commentary on this psalm, interprets the passage as referring to the truthfulness of God in contrast to humanity, saying that the elaboration of God's actions in the psalm reflect promises God had made with the Israelites.

The genre of the psalm is unclear.  sees in it most as the "prophetic action liturgy". Hermann Gunkel also speaks of the Psalm as "liturgy". Here "liturgy" means the intention of the performance was for changing voices was in the service.

Structure
Gunkel divides the psalm as follows:
Verses 2-2: After a short cry for help, the complaint that falsehood prevails
Verses 4-5: desire YHWH may intervene
Verse 6: consolation that YHWH salvation appears now
Verses 7-9: Answers: praise the word of YHWH

Usage

Judaism
This psalm is recited on Shmini Atzeret and at a brit milah.

Catholic Church
According to the Rule of St. Benedict (530 AD), Psalm 1 to Psalm 20 were mainly reserved for the office of Prime. This Psalm, 11, was recited or sung at Prime on Wednesdays. A number of monasteries still respect this tradition. In the Liturgy of the Hours, Psalm 12 is now recited on Tuesdays of the first week during the midday office.

Musical settings 
In 1523, Martin Luther paraphrased Psalm 12 in a hymn, "Ach Gott, vom Himmel sieh darein". Heinrich Schütz wrote a setting of it, SWV 108, for the Becker Psalter, published first in 1628. Johann Sebastian Bach wrote a cantata about it,  Ach Gott, vom Himmel sieh darein, BWV 2 in Leipzig in 1724.

References

External links 

 
 
  in Hebrew and English - Mechon-mamre
 Text of Psalm 12 according to the 1928 Psalter
 For the leader; "upon the eighth." A psalm of David. / Help, LORD, for no one loyal remains; / the faithful have vanished from the children of men. text and footnotes, usccb.org United States Conference of Catholic Bishops
 Psalm 12:1 introduction and text, biblestudytools.com
 Psalm 12 – The Words of Man and the Word of God enduringword.com
 Psalm 12 / Refrain: You, O Lord, will watch over us. Church of England
 Psalm 12 at biblegateway.com
 Hymns for Psalm 12 hymnary.org

012
Works attributed to David